Cascas District is one of four districts of the province Gran Chimú in Peru.

References